Count Hugo Erik Gustaf Hamilton  (21 August 1849 – 27 January 1928) was a Swedish politician, Minister for Civil Service Affairs between 1907–1921 and the eight Speaker of Första kammaren of the Riksdag.

Biography
Hugo Erik Gustaf Hamilton was born on 21 August 1849 on Blomberg, Husaby, Skaraborg County to county governor count Adolf Ludvig Hamilton and Johanna Ulrika Agnes Geijer. He took his jurist grade from Uppsala University in 1878. He was a member of the city council of City of Stockholm in 1888—1893 and 1896—1900 Hamilton was a member of Andra kammaren in 1891–1893 and 1897–1901. On 31 March 1900, he became Governor of Gävleborg County, which he was until 18 September 1918. Between 4 December 1907 and 7 October 1911, Hamilton was Minister for Civil Service Affairs in Sweden. Hamilton became a member of Första kammaren in 1908. Speaker of Första kammaren of the Riksdag from 1916 to his death in 1928. Hamilton died on 27 January 1928 on Högfors bruk, Karbenning, Värmland County.

Family
On 8 September 1881 in Högfors, Hamilton married countess Elvine Åkerhielm af Blombacka, daughter of county governor count Hans Samuel Knut Åkerhielm af Blombacka and Maria Ulrika Josefina Björkman.

References

1849 births
1928 deaths
Swedish counts
Government ministers of Sweden
County governors of Sweden
Speakers of Första kammaren
Members of the Första kammaren
Members of the Andra kammaren